The 1972 Tour de France started with the following 12 teams, each with 11 cyclists:

In the previous year, Ocana was on his way to beat Merckx, when he fell as leader and had to give up. Everybody expected Merckx and Ocana to battle for the victory in 1972. Ocana felt that he could have won the 1971 Tour, and Merckx did not like the comments that he did not deserve the 1971 victory, and both wanted to show their strengths.
Merckx had won important races before the Tour started, including the 1972 Giro d'Italia, and was also the reigning world champion. Ocana had won less races, but won the Criterium du Dauphiné Libéré.

The most important other participants were considered Raymond Poulidor, Felice Gimondi, Joop Zoetemelk and Bernard Thévenet.

José Manuel Fuente, who had won the 1972 Vuelta a España and finished second in the 1972 Giro d'Italia, did not compete, as his team decided they had already been in too many hard races.

Herman Van Springel had announced four days prior to the Tour that he would leave his team after his contract would end at the end of 1972. His team then removed him from the Tour squad.

Start list

By team

By rider

By nationality

References

1972 Tour de France
1972